TCP is a mild antiseptic, produced in France by Laboratoires Chemineau in Vouvray and sold in the United Kingdom by Omega Pharma.

TCP was introduced in 1918.  The brand name comes from its original chemical name, which was trichlorophenylmethyliodosalicyl (not to be confused with trichlorophenol, a common fungicide). Trichlorophenylmethyliodosalicyl was replaced as the active ingredient by a mixture of phenol and halogenated phenols in the 1950s. The liquid form of TCP is one of the best-known brands of antiseptic in the UK, and its distinctively strong medicinal odour can be identified by many as a generic antiseptic smell.

Omega Pharma acquired the rights to TCP from Pfizer in 2004.

Forms
A TCP throat lozenge is also available. TCP was available formerly as an ointment, TCP Original Antiseptic Ointment 30 g.

A spray plaster was or is available under the TCP brand.

Uses
The instructions on the TCP bottle state that TCP can be used for sore throats, mouth ulcers, cuts, grazes, bites and stings, boils, spots and pimples.

It can also be used as a mouthwash when diluted, and can also be used as a general disinfectant.

Harmful effects
Published advice states that TCP should not be swallowed, and recommends drinking plenty of water if 30ml or more of TCP is swallowed, and seeking medical advice if discomfort persists. Phenolic compounds such as those in TCP are harmful to cats.

Ingredients
TCP Liquid's active ingredients are halogenated phenols and phenol. (One source says each millilitre of TCP antiseptic contains, chlorinated phenols ; phenol ; iodinated phenols ; sodium salicylate .) It also contains glycerol, concentrated phosphoric acid, Quinoline Yellow WS and water. Formerly, when the product was manufactured by Unicliffe Ltd, the bottle label's list of ingredients stated, referring to the solution of halogenated phenolic bodies, "with partial elimination of the ionisable halides".

In popular culture
TCP was referred to numerous times in a running gag in Episode 2 of Series 2 of the BBC sitcom One Foot in the Grave, alluding to its distinctive and long-lasting odour. TCP was mentioned as an ingredient in a tonic in the film The Strange Case of the End of Civilization as We Know It (1977). In the 1963 Ian Fleming story Agent 007 in New York, James Bond laments the fact that one of his lovers always gargles with TCP after their trysts. TCP is used as the subject of a song by the same name on The Boys' 1978 album Alternative Chartbusters written by Honest John Plain. TCP is mentioned in the song "Obsessions" by Suede. In the Black Mirror episode Metalhead (series 4 episode 5), a broken bottle of TCP is seen being pulled out of a backpack in advance of minor surgery. A bottle of TCP is also briefly seen in the film Shallow Grave (1994) in the scene following Ewan McGregor's character Alex being beaten up.

It was also referenced in TV sitcom ‘’Only Fools and Horses’’ where lead character Del Boy is said to have treated a stab wound with “TCP and a flannel”, owing to his fear of hospitals.

See also
Bactine
Dettol
Germolene
Savlon

References

External links
 TCP datasheet

Antiseptics
Products introduced in 1918